Pope Paul IV, born Gian Pietro Carafa (28 June 1476 – 18 August 1559) was head of the Catholic Church and ruler of the Papal States from 23 May 1555 to his death in August 1559.  While serving as papal nuncio in Spain, he developed an anti-Spanish outlook that later coloured his papacy. In response to an invasion of part of the Papal States by Spain during his papacy, he called for a French military intervention. After a defeat of the French and with Spanish troops at the edge of Rome, the Papacy and Spain reached a compromise: French and Spanish forces left the Papal States and the Pope thereafter adopted a neutral stance between France and Spain.

Carafa was appointed bishop of Chieti, but resigned in 1524 in order to found with St. Cajetan the Congregation of Clerics Regular (Theatines). Recalled to Rome, and made Archbishop of Naples, he worked to re-organize the Inquisitorial system in response to the emerging Protestant movement in Europe, any dialogue with which he opposed (the inquisition itself had been first instituted by Pope Innocent III who first regulated inquisitional procedure in the 13th century). Carafa was elected pope in 1555 through the influence of Cardinal Alessandro Farnese in the face of opposition from Emperor Charles V. His papacy was characterized by strong nationalism in reaction to the influence of Philip II of Spain and the Habsburgs. The appointment of Carlo Carafa as Cardinal Nephew damaged the papacy further, and scandals forced Paul to remove him from office. He curbed some clerical abuses in Rome, but his methods were seen as harsh. He would introduce the first modern Index Librorum Prohibitorum or "Index of Prohibited Books" banning works he saw as in error. In spite of his advanced age, he was a tireless worker and issued new decrees and regulations daily, unrelenting in his determination to keep Protestants and recently immigrated Marranos from gaining influence in the Papal States. He had some hundred of the Marranos of Ancona thrown into prison; 50 were sentenced by the tribunal of the Inquisition and 25 of these were burned at the stake. Paul IV issued the Papal bull Cum nimis absurdum, which confined Jews in Rome to the neighbourhood claustro degli Ebrei ("enclosure of the Hebrews"), later known as the Roman Ghetto.  He died highly unpopular, to the point that his family rushed his burial to make sure his body would not be desecrated by a popular uprising.

Early life
Gian Pietro Carafa was born in Capriglia Irpina, near Avellino, into the prominent Carafa family of Naples. His father Giovanni Antonio Carafa died in West Flanders in 1516 and his mother Vittoria Camponeschi was the daughter of Pietro Lalle Camponeschi, 5th Conte di Montorio, a Neapolitan nobleman, and Dona Maria de Noronha, a Portuguese noblewoman of the House of Pereira.

Church career

Bishop
He was mentored by Cardinal Oliviero Carafa, his relative, who resigned the see of Chieti (Latin Theate) in his favour.  Under the direction of Pope Leo X, he was ambassador to England and then papal nuncio in Spain, where he conceived a violent detestation of Spanish rule that affected the policies of his later papacy.

In 1524, Pope Clement VII allowed Carafa to resign his benefices and join the ascetic and newly founded Congregation of Clerks Regular, popularly called the Theatines, after Carafa's see of Theate.  Following the sack of Rome in 1527, the order moved to Venice.  But Carafa was recalled to Rome by the reform-minded Pope Paul III (1534–49), to sit on a committee of reform of the papal court, an appointment that forecasted an end to a humanist papacy and a revival of scholasticism, as Carafa was a disciple of Thomas Aquinas.

Cardinal
In December 1536 he was made Cardinal-Priest of S. Pancrazio and then Archbishop of Naples.

The Regensburg Colloquy in 1541 failed to achieve any measure of reconciliation between Catholics and Protestants in Europe, but instead saw a number of prominent Italians defect to the Protestant camp. In response, Carafa was able to persuade Pope Paul III to set up a Roman Inquisition, modelled on the Spanish Inquisition with himself as one of the Inquisitors-General. The Papal Bull was promulgated in 1542 and Carafa vowed, "Even if my own father were a heretic, I would gather the wood to burn him".

Election as pope

He was a surprise choice as pope to succeed Pope Marcellus II (1555); his severe and unbending character combined with his advanced age and Italian patriotism meant under normal circumstances he would have declined the honor. He accepted apparently because Emperor Charles V was opposed to his accession.

Carafa, elected on 23 May 1555, took the name of "Paul IV" in honor of Pope Paul III who named him as a cardinal. He was crowned as pope on 26 May 1555 by the protodeacon. He formally took possession of the Basilica of Saint John Lateran on 28 October 1555.

Papacy
As pope, Paul IV's nationalism was a driving force; he used the office to preserve some liberties in the face of fourfold foreign occupation. Like Pope Paul III, he was an enemy of the Colonna family. His treatment of Giovanna d'Aragona, who had married into that family, drew further negative comment from Venice because she had long been a patron of artists and writers.

Paul IV was displeased at the French signing a five-year truce with Spain in February 1556 (in the midst of the Italian War of 1551–1559) and urged King Henry II to join the Papal States in an invasion of Spanish Naples. On 1 September 1556, King Philip II responded by preemptively invading the Papal States with 12,000 men under the Duke of Alba. French forces approaching from the north were defeated and forced to withdraw at Civitella in August 1557. The papal armies were left exposed and were defeated, with Spanish troops arriving at the edge of Rome. Out of fear of another sack of Rome, Paul IV agreed to the Duke of Alba's demand for the Papal States to declare neutrality by signing the Peace of Cave-Palestrina on 12 September 1557. Emperor Charles V criticized the peace agreement as being overly generous to the Pope.

As cardinal-nephew, Carlo Carafa became his uncle's chief political adviser. Having accepted a pension from the French, Cardinal Carafa worked to secure a French alliance. Carlo's older brother Giovanni was made commander of the papal forces and Duke of Paliano after the pro-Spanish Colonna were deprived of that town in 1556. Another nephew, Antonio, was given command of the papal guard and made Marquis of Montebello. Their conduct became notorious in Rome. However, at the conclusion of the disastrous war with Philip II of Spain in the Italian War, and after many scandals, Paul IV publicly disgraced his nephews and banished them from Rome in 1559.

With the Protestant Reformation, the papacy required all Roman Catholic rulers to consider Protestant rulers as heretics, thus making their realms illegitimate.  At the time of Paul's election, Queen Mary I of England was two years into her reign, and was rolling back the English Reformation that had occurred under her half-brother Edward VI.  Paul IV issued a papal bull in 1555, removing all Church measures against the English government, and further recognising Mary and her husband Philip as King and Queen of Ireland, rather than merely being "lord".  Despite the bull, his relations with England were not positive.  Paul IV had known Cardinal Reginald Pole while Pole was living in Italy and the two had been members of the spirituali together.  Pole was the leader of Mary's efforts, but Paul IV seems to have hated Pole and become convinced he was a crypto-Protestant.  Combined with hostility towards Spain and thus Mary's husband, Paul IV refused to allow any English bishops to be appointed, and began inquisitorial discipline proceedings against Pole, leading to the "farcical" situation that by 1558, the most serious opponent of English Catholicism was the Pope himself.  He also angered people in England by insisting on the restitution of property confiscated during the dissolution of the monasteries.  After Mary's death, he rejected the succession of Elizabeth I of England to the Crown.

Paul IV was violently opposed to the liberal Cardinal Giovanni Morone, whom he strongly suspected of being a hidden Protestant, so much that he had him imprisoned. In order to prevent Morone from succeeding him and imposing what he believed to be his Protestant beliefs on the Church, Pope Paul IV codified the Catholic Law excluding heretics and non-Catholics from receiving or legitimately becoming pope, in the bull Cum ex apostolatus officio.

Paul IV was rigidly orthodox, austere in life, and authoritarian in manner. He affirmed the Catholic doctrine of extra ecclesiam nulla salus ('outside the Church there is no salvation'), and used the Holy Office to suppress the Spirituali, a Catholic group deemed heretical. The strengthening of the Inquisition continued under Paul IV, and few could consider themselves safe by virtue of position in his drive to reform the Church; even cardinals he disliked could be imprisoned. He appointed inquisitor Michele Ghislieri, the future Pope Pius V, to the position of Supreme Inquisitor despite the fact as Inquisitor of Como, Ghislieri's persecutions had inspired a citywide rebellion, forcing him to flee in fear for his life.

On 17 July 1555, Paul IV issued one of the most infamous papal bulls in Church history.  The bull, Cum nimis absurdum, ordered the creation of a Jewish ghetto in Rome.  The pope set its borders near the Rione Sant'Angelo, an area where large numbers of Jews already resided, and ordered it walled off from the rest of the city. A single gate, locked every day at sundown, was the only means of reaching the rest of the city. The Jews themselves were forced to pay all design and construction costs related to the project, which came to a total of roughly 300 scudi. The bull restricted Jews in other ways as well. They were forbidden to have more than one synagogue per city—leading, in Rome alone, to the destruction of seven "excess" places of worship.  All Jews were forced to wear distinctive yellow hats, especially outside the ghetto, and they were forbidden to trade in everything but food and secondhand clothes.  Christians of all ages were encouraged to treat the Jews as second-class citizens; for a Jew to defy a Christian in any way was to invite severe punishment, often at the hands of a mob.  By the end of Paul IV's five-year reign, the number of Roman Jews had dropped by half.  Yet his anti-Jewish legacy endured for over 300 years: the ghetto he established ceased to exist only with the dissolution of the Papal States in 1870.  Its walls were torn down in 1888.

According to Leopold von Ranke, a rigid austerity and an earnest zeal for the restoration of primitive habits became the dominant tendency of his papacy. Monks who had left their monasteries were expelled from the city and from the Papal States. He would no longer tolerate the practice by which one man had been allowed to enjoy the revenues of an office while delegating its duties to another.

All begging was forbidden. Even the collection of alms for Masses, which had previously been made by the clergy, was discontinued. A medal was struck representing Christ driving the money changers from the Temple. Paul IV put in place a reform of the papal administration designed to stamp out trafficking of principal positions in the Curia. All secular offices, from the highest to the lowest, were assigned to others based on merit. Important economies were made, and taxes were proportionately remitted. Paul IV established a chest, of which only he held the key, for the purpose of receiving all complaints that anyone desired to make.

During his papacy, censorship reached new heights. Among his first acts as pope was to cut off Michelangelo's pension, and he ordered the nudes of The Last Judgment in the Sistine Chapel be painted more modestly (a request that Michelangelo ignored) (the beginning of the Vatican's Fig leaf campaign). Paul IV also introduced the Index Librorum Prohibitorum or "Index of Prohibited Books" to Venice, then an independent and prosperous trading state, in order to crack down on the growing threat of Protestantism. Under his authority, all books written by Protestants were banned, together with Italian and German translations of the Latin Bible.

In the Papal States, a Marrano presence was noticeable. In Rome and, even more so, the seaport of Ancona, they thrived under benevolent popes Clement VII (1523–34), Paul III (1534–49), and Julius III (1550–55). They even received a guarantee that if accused of apostasy they would be subject only to papal authority. But Paul IV (1555–59), the voice of the Counter-Reformation, dealt them an irreparable blow when he withdrew the protections previously given and initiated a campaign against them. As a result of this, 25 were burned at the stake in the spring of 1556.

Consistories

Throughout his pontificate, Paul IV named 46 cardinals in four consistories, including his future successor Michele Ghislieri (the future Pope Pius V). According to Robert Maryks, the pope decided to nominate the Jesuit priest Diego Laínez to the cardinalate. However, Father Alfonso Salmerón warned Saint Ignatius of Loyola of this, as did Cardinal Otto Truchsess von Waldburg. In response, Father Pedro de Ribadeneyra repeated what the saint had said to him: "If our Lord does not lay down his hand, we will have Master Laínez a cardinal, but I certify to you, if it were, that it be with so much noise that the world would understand how the Society accepts these things".

Death
Paul IV's health began to break down in May 1559. He rallied in July, holding public audiences and attending meetings of the Inquisition. But he engaged in fasting, and the heat of the summer wore him down again. He was bedridden, and on 17 August it became clear he would not live. Cardinals and other officials gathered at his bedside on 18 August, where Paul IV asked them to elect a "righteous and holy" successor and to retain the Inquisition as "the very basis" of the Catholic Church's power. By 2 or 3 pm, he was close to death, and died at 5 pm.

The people of Rome did not forget what they had suffered because of the war he had brought on the State. Crowds of people gathered at the Piazza del Campidoglio and began rioting even before Paul IV died. His statue, erected before the Campidoglio just months before, had a yellow hat placed on it (similar to the yellow hat Paul IV had forced Jews to wear in public). After a mock trial, the statue was decapitated. It was then thrown into the Tiber.

The crowd broke into the three city jails and freed more than 400 prisoners, then broke into the offices of the Inquisition at the Palazzo dell' Inquisizone near to the Church of San Rocco. They murdered the Inquisitor, Tommaso Scotti, and freed 72 prisoners. One of those released was Dominican John Craig, who later was a colleague of John Knox. The people ransacked the palace, and then set it afire (destroying the Inquisition's records). That same day, or the next day (records are unclear), the crowd attacked the Church of Santa Maria sopra Minerva. The intercession of some local nobility dissuaded them from burning it and killing all those within. On the third day of rioting, the crowd removed the Carafa family coat of arms from all churches, monuments, and other buildings in the city.

The crowd dedicated to him the following pasquinata:

Carafa hated by the devil and the sky
is buried here with his rotting corpse,
Erebus has taken the spirit;
he hated peace on earth, our faith he contested.
he ruined the church and the people, men and sky offended;
treacherous friend, suppliant with the army which was fatal to him.
You want to know more? Pope was him and that is enough.

Such hostile views have not mellowed much with time; modern historians tend to view his papacy as an especially poor one. His policies stemmed from personal prejudices—against Spain, for example, or the Jews—rather than any overarching political or religious goals. In a time of precarious balance between Catholic and Protestant, his adversarial nature did little to slow the latter's spread across northern Europe.  His anti-Spanish feelings alienated the Habsburgs, arguably the most powerful Catholic rulers in Europe, and his ascetic personal beliefs left him out of touch with the artistic and intellectual movements of his era (he often spoke of whitewashing the Sistine ceiling).  Such a reactionary attitude alienated clergy and laity alike: historian John Julius Norwich calls him "the worst pope of the 16th century."

Four or five hours after his death, Paul IV's body was taken to the Cappella Paolina in the Apostolic Palace. It lay in repose, and a choir sang the Office of the Dead on the morning of 19 August. Cardinals and many others then paid homage to Paul IV ("kissed the feet of the pope"). The canons of St. Peter's Basilica refused to take his body into the basilica unless they were paid the customary money and gifts. Instead, the canons sang the usual office in the Cappella del Santissimo Sacramento (Chapel of the Blessed Sacrament). Paul IV's body was taken to the Sistine Chapel in the Apostolic Palace at 6 pm.

Paul IV's nephew, Cardinal-nephew Carlo Carafa, arrived in Rome late on 19 August. Worried that the rioters might break in and desecrate the pope's corpse, at 10 pm Cardinal Carafa had Pope Paul IV buried without ceremony next to the Cappella del Volto Santo (Chapel of the Holy Face) in St. Peter's. His remains stayed there until October 1566, when his successor as pope, Pius V, had them transferred to Santa Maria sopra Minerva. In the chapel founded by Paul IV's uncle and mentor, Cardinal Oliviero Carafa, a tomb was created by Pirro Ligorio and Paul IV's remains were placed therein.

In fiction
Paul IV's title in the Prophecy of St. Malachy is "Of the Faith of Peter".

As Paul IV, Carafa appears as a character in John Webster's Jacobean revenge drama The White Devil (1612).

In the novel Q by Luther Blissett, while not appearing himself, Gian Pietro Carafa is mentioned repeatedly as the cardinal whose spy and agent provocateur, Qoelet, causes many of the disasters to befall Protestants during the Reformation and the Roman Church's response in the 16th century.

Alison MacLeod's 1968 historical novel "The Hireling" depicts Cardinal Caraffa befriending the English Cardinal Reginald Pole during Pole's long exile in Italy, their later falling out, and Pole's feelings of betrayal after Caraffa, once elevated to the Papacy, charges him with heresy at the very time when Pole was striving to return England to the Catholic fold.

Pope Paul IV is a major villain in Sholem Asch's 1921 historical novel The Witch of Castile (Yiddish: Di Kishufmakherin fun Kastilien, Hebrew: Ha'Machshepha Mi'Castilia המכשפה מקשיטליה). The book's depiction of a young Sephardi Jewish woman in Rome being falsely accused of witchcraft and being burned at the stake, dying as a Jewish martyr, is placed in the context of Paul IV's actual persecution of the Jews.

See also
 Cardinals created by Paul IV

References

Bibliography

 Aubert, Alberto. Paolo IV. Politica, Inquisizione e storiografia, Firenze, Le Lettere, 1999
 Booth, Ted W. "Elizabeth I and Pope Paul IV: Reticence and Reformation". Church History and Religious Culture 94.3 (2014): 316–336 online.
 
 Firpo, Massimo. Inquisizione romana e Controriforma. Studi sul cardinal Giovanni Morone (1509–1580) e il suo processo d'eresia, Brescia, Morcelliana, 2005
 Mampieri, Martina. "From Paul IV 'the Evil' to Pius IV 'the Merciful. in Living under the Evil Pope (Brill, 2019). 160–204.
 Mathews, Shailer. "The Social Teaching of Paul. IV. The Messianism of Paul". Biblical World 19.4 (1902): 279–287 online.
 Pattenden, Miles. Pius IV and the Fall of the Carafa: Nepotism and Papal Authority in Counter-Reformation Rome (Oxford UP, 2013).
 Pocock, Nicholas, Marinus Marinius, and J. Barengus. "Bull of Paul IV concerning the Bishopric of Bristol". English Historical Review 12.46 (1897): 303–307. .
 Santosuosso, Antonio. "An Account of the Election of Paul IV to the Pontificate". Renaissance Quarterly 31.4 (1978): 486–498. .

External links

 Article "Paul IV" in Dizionario storico dell'Inquisizione 
 Dispatches of Bernardo Navagero, Venetian ambassador, and others documents about the papacy of Paul IV 
Paul IV letter to Philip II, MSS 8489 at L. Tom Perry Special Collections, Brigham Young University

 
1476 births
1559 deaths
People from the Province of Avellino
Inquisitors
Italian popes
Carafa, Giovanni Pietro
Cardinal-bishops of Albano
Cardinal-bishops of Frascati
Cardinal-bishops of Ostia
Cardinal-bishops of Porto
Cardinal-bishops of Sabina
Bishops of Chieti
House of Carafa
Diplomats of the Holy See
Archbishops of Naples
16th-century Italian Roman Catholic bishops
Members of the Holy Office
Popes
Burials at Santa Maria sopra Minerva
16th-century popes
Theatine popes
Jewish Roman (city) history